Kludd can refer to:

A chaplain in the Ku Klux Klan
A character from the Guardians of Ga'Hoole fantasy novel series by Kathryn Lasky